The World Masters, known for sponsorship reasons as the Mita/Sky World Masters, was a snooker tournament held between 13 and 26 January 1991. Conceived by promoter Barry Hearn, the tournament had a similar format to the Grand Slam events in tennis, with men's singles, men's doubles, women's singles, women's doubles, mixed doubles and a junior competition. As in tennis, players had to win a match by two clear frames. If a match was tied going into a final frame, an additional two frames would be played. If the players were still level, there would be a tie break deciding frame with just one red and all the colours.

There was controversy when Alex Higgins was invited to participate, despite being banned from snooker for the whole of the 1990/1991 season for punching an official at the 1990 World Championship, as the World Masters was not a WPBSA-run event. A number of players, among them reigning world champion Stephen Hendry, were unhappy with Higgins' inclusion and threatened to boycott the event if he appeared in it. Higgins voluntarily withdrew, and Hendry took his place in the tournament.

Staged at the National Exhibition Centre in Birmingham, it carried a record amount of prize money of £1,000,000 ; the winner of the men's singles won £200,000, more than the world champion would receive that year. During the tournament James Wattana made the ninth official maximum break against Paul Dawkins. However, the break was not filmed due to it being on one of the outside tables. Meanwhile, a 13-year-old Quinten Hann became the youngest player to make a televised century break. The tournament was subsequently unable to find sponsorship, and was not staged again.

The tournament was televised by the original incarnation of Eurosport. Coverage was presented by Dickie Davies, who had presented snooker on ITV until 1989. Matthew Lorenzo was the 'roving reporter'. The commentary team was Peter Brackley, Mike Watterson, Jim Wych, Paul Wade, Willie Jameson and Phil Yates. Alternative commentary was available in other languages across continental Europe, including from long-time commentator Rolf Kalb in Germany.

Winners

Main draw (men's singles)

Main draw (women's singles)
Sources: Rothmans Snooker Yearbook 1991–92, Snooker Scene

Prize Money (Women's Singles)
Prize money was awarded as follows:
Winner (Karen Corr) £15,000
Runner-up (Stacey Hillyard) £5,000
Losing semi-finalists £3,000
Losing quarter-finalists £1,500
Second round losers £1,000
First round losers £500
Highest  (Ann-Marie Farren, 62) £2,000

References

External links
 When Snooker went all Wimbledon

Snooker competitions in England
Snooker non-ranking competitions
World Masters
World Masters
World Masters
Sport in Birmingham, West Midlands
1990s in Birmingham, West Midlands